The Men's 1500 metres at the 2011 World Youth Championships in Athletics was held at the Stadium Nord Lille Métropole from 7 to 10 of July.

Medalists

Heats 
Qualification rule: first 3 of each heat (Q) plus the 3 fastest times (q) qualified.

Heat 1

Heat 2

Heat 3

Final

References 

2011 World Youth Championships in Athletics